Pulque, or octli, is an  alcoholic beverage made from the fermented sap of the maguey (agave) plant. It is traditional in central Mexico, where it has been produced for millennia. It has the color of milk, a rather viscous consistency and a sour yeast-like taste.

The drink's history extends far back into the Mesoamerican period, when it was considered sacred, and its use was limited to certain classes of people.  After the Spanish Conquest of the Aztec Empire, the drink became secular and its consumption rose.  The consumption of pulque reached its peak in the late 19th century. In the 20th century, the drink fell into decline, mostly because of competition from beer, which became more prevalent with the arrival of European immigrants. There are some efforts to revive the drink's popularity through tourism. Similar drinks exist elsewhere in Latin America, such as guarango in Ecuador (see miske).

Description
Pulque is a milk-colored, somewhat viscous liquid that produces a light foam.  It is made by fermenting the sap of certain types of maguey (agave) plants. In contrast, mezcal is made from the cooked heart of certain agave plants, and tequila is made all or mostly from the blue agave. About six varieties of maguey are best used for the production of pulque. The name pulque is derived from Nahuatl. The original name of the drink was iztāc octli  (white pulque), the term pulque was probably mistakenly derived by the Spanish from the octli poliuhqui , which meant "spoiled pulque".

It is one of two types of fermented agave drink known from Mexico at the time of European contact: pulque is made with sap taken from the stem, while the other was made with pit roasted stems and leaf bases.

Maguey

The maguey plant, also called a "century plant" in English, is native to Mexico. It grows best in the cold, dry climates of the rocky central highlands to the north and east of Mexico City, especially in the states of Hidalgo and Tlaxcala. Maguey has been cultivated at least since 200 CE in Tula, Tulancingo and Teotihuacan, and wild plants have been exploited for far longer. The plant historically has had a number of uses. Fibers can be extracted from the thick leaves to make rope or fabric, its thorns can be used as needles or punches and the membrane covering the leaves can be used as paper or for cooking. The name maguey was given by the Spanish, who picked it up from the Taíno. This is still its common name in Spanish, with Agave being its scientific generic or technical name. The Nahuatl name of the plant is metl.

The manufacturing process of pulque is complex and requires the death of the maguey plant. As the plant nears maturity, the center begins to swell and elongate as the plant gathers stored sugar to send up a single flower stalk, which may reach up to 20 feet in height. However, plants destined for pulque production have this flower stalk cut off, leaving a depressed surface 12-18 inches in diameter. In this center, the maguey sap, known as aguamiel (honeywater), collects. It takes a maguey plant 12 years to mature enough to produce the sap for pulque.

History

Mythological origins

Pulque has been drunk for at least 2000 years, and its origins are the subject of various stories and myths. Most involve Mayahuel, the goddess of the maguey. It was thought that the aguamiel collecting in the center of the plant was her blood. Other deities, such as the Centzon Totochtin (400 rabbits) are associated with it, by representing the drink's effects, and are the children of Mayahuel.  Another version involving Mayahuel has her as a mortal woman who discovered how to collect aguamiel but someone named Pantecatl  discovered how to make pulque.

According to another story, pulque was discovered by the Tlacuache  (opossum), who used his human-like hands to dig into the maguey and extract the naturally fermenting juice. He became the first drunk. Tlacuache was thought to set the course of rivers.  The rivers he set were generally straight except when he was drunk. Then they follow Tlacuache's meandering path from cantina to cantina.

Another account traces the discovery of aguamiel to the Toltec Empire, when a noble named Papantzin was trying to get the emperor to marry his daughter Xochitl. He sent her to the capital with an offering of aguamiel, honey of the agave plant. The emperor and princess wed, and their son was named Meconetzin  (maguey son). In other versions of the story, Xochitl is credited with discovering pulque.

Pre-Hispanic period

The maguey was one of the most sacred and important plants in ancient Mexico. It had a privileged place in mythology, religious rituals and the Mesoamerican economy.  Pulque appears in a number of graphic representations from pre-colonial times, beginning with stone carvings from about 200 CE. The first major work involving pulque is a large mural called the "Pulque Drinkers", unearthed in 1968 at the pyramid of Cholula, Puebla. The most likely means of the discovery of aguamiel and fermented pulque was from the observation of rodents who gnaw and scratch at the plant to drink the seeping sap. Fermentation of the aguamiel can take place within the plant itself.

For the indigenous peoples of the central highlands of Mexico, the imbibing of pulque was done only by certain people, under certain conditions. It was a ritual drink, consumed during certain festivals, such as that of the goddess Mayahuel, and the god Mixcoatl. It was drunk by priests and sacrificial victims, to increase the priests' enthusiasm and to ease the suffering of the victim. There are many references in Aztec codices, such as the Borbonicus Codex, of pulque's use by nobility and priesthood to celebrate victories. Among commoners, it was permitted only to the elderly and pregnant women. Production of pulque was ritualized and the brewers were superstitious. They would abstain from sex during the fermentation period because they believed that sexual intercourse would sour the process.

Colonial period

After the Conquest, pulque lost its sacred character, and both natives and Spanish people began to drink it. The Spanish initially made no laws regarding its use. It became a lucrative source of tax revenue, but by 1672, public drunkenness had become enough of a problem that the viceregal government created regulations to curtail its consumption. A maximum of 36 "pulquerías" were permitted for Mexico City, which had to be located in open areas, be without doors and close at sundown. Food, music, dancing and the co-mingling of the sexes were prohibited. However, pulque continued to play a major role in the socioeconomic history of Mexico during colonial times and in the early years of Independence. Through this period, it was the fourth largest source of tax revenue. At the end of the 17th century, the Jesuits began large-scale production of the drink to finance their educational institutions. In this way, the making of pulque passed from being a home brew to one commercially produced.

Drunkenness depicted in art 

The casta system of racial hierarchy was created in Spanish America for elites to classify individuals into groups based on phenotype and perceived social class, and give them characteristics that were supposedly inherent to their group. Often artists portrayed mixed-race castas. This form of Mexican art portrayed castas in settings that were typical of their social group. The portrayal of pulque was used to show polarization between different castas.  Before the Spanish colonization of the Americas, pulque was used for religious ceremonies in Mesoamerica, but after the Spanish conquest, pulque consumption lost its ritual meanings.

In some casta paintings, pulque consumption was depicted. Some casta painters depicted different castas safely consuming and selling pulque.  Other casta painters depicted Indigenous Americans intoxicated in the streets and incapacitated, which as a result required their families to escort them home. In one of his 1828 depictions, Italian lithographer Claudio Linati showed two Indigenous women engaged in a dispute outside of a pulquería.

Post-colonial period

Production of pulque exploded after Independence, when the regulation of pulque producers ended, and Mexican nationalism increased. From then until the 1860s, pulque haciendas multiplied, especially in Hidalgo and Tlaxcala states. In 1866, the first railway between Veracruz and Mexico City began operations, crossing through Hidalgo. This line was soon known as the "Pulque Train" because it brought supplies of the drink daily to the capital. This production and easy shipment of the drink made Hidalgo rich, and gave rise to a "pulque aristocracy" made up of some of the most powerful families of this time: Torres Adalid, Pimenta y Fagoaga, Macedo and others. At its peak, there were about 300 pulque haciendas. Some still remain in the plains of Apan and Zempoala, in Hidalgo. Pulque hit its peak of popularity during the late 19th century, when it was enjoyed by rich and poor alike.

Depictions of tlaquicheros, pulquerías, and pulque haciendas were the subject of photographers in the late Porfiriato, including photographers C. B. Waite, Hugo Brehme, and Sergei Eisenstein.  The tlaquichero "was perhaps the most widely known and successful of the images of Mexican types."

As late as 1953, Hidalgo and Tlaxcala still obtained 30 and 50% respectively of their total revenues from pulque. This has diminished since then since irrigation, roads and other infrastructure has made possible other, more lucrative enterprises.

Decline
In spite of its former popularity, pulque represents only 10% of the alcoholic beverages consumed in Mexico today. Pulque is still consumed in Mexico, mostly in the central highlands and predominantly in rural and poor areas. It has acquired a general connotation of being something for the lower class, while consumption of European-style beer flourished throughout the 20th century.

The complex and delicate fermentation process of pulque had always limited the product's distribution, as it does not keep long and agitation during transport speeds degradation. Since pre-Hispanic times, its consumption has mostly been limited to the central highlands of Mexico.

The decline of pulque began in the first decade of the 20th century, when the Mexican Revolution caused a decline in its production. In the 1930s, the government of Lázaro Cárdenas campaigned against pulque, as part of an effort to reduce alcoholic consumption in general. But the most decisive factor to the decline of pulque has been the introduction of beer.

European immigrant beer brewers in the early 20th century had their own campaign against the native pulque, claiming that pulque producers used a muñeca (doll), a textile bag containing human or animal feces which was placed in the aguamiel to hasten the fermentation process. Some pulque producers have insisted that the muñeca is completely a myth, but modern historians suggest that it did happen, although only rarely. Beer producers promoted the idea that pulque was generally made this way, generally by word of mouth and insinuation. This was done to inhibit pulque sales and to promote the consumption of beer, which they claimed was "rigorously hygienic and modern".

In part because of this strategy, pulque now generally looked down upon, and imbibed by relatively few people, with Mexican-brewed beer ubiquitous and extremely popular. Pulque's popularity is low and continues to fall. Twenty years ago, about 20 trucks would come every three days to Xochimilco (in southern Mexico City) to deliver pulque, but now the number is down to one or two. Only five pulquerias remain in this district, where there used to be 18. The situation is similar in most other parts of Mexico. The remaining pulquerias are very small establishments, selling a product made by small producers.

In the state of Hidalgo, in which most maguey is grown, fields of this plant are disappearing, with barley taking its place. Most maguey plants here serve as boundary markers between properties. Many of these plants do not survive long, as they are often vandalized. An estimated 10,000 plants are mutilated each week by cutting off the lower leaves for barbacoa or destroying them completely to look for the edible white grubs or ant eggs that can inhabit them.

A recent series of PBS travel shows feature pulque and say that it is once again a very popular drink and that there is a retro movement leading younger people seeking to establish their Mexican heritage to drink this beverage in large quantities. It has become a trendy drink among youth and back-to-your-roots types. The prohibition on female drinkers has also been lifted and co-ed pulquerias are now the norm.

Also flavored syrups, seasonings and so on are now common with one pulqueria featured in the special offering 48 separate flavors.

Production

The production process is long and delicate. The maguey plant needs 12 years of maturation before the sap, or aguamiel, can be extracted, but a good plant can produce for up to one year. This aguamiel can be drunk straight, but it is alcoholic only after a fermentation process that can start in the plant itself. This liquid is collected twice a day from the plant, yielding about five or six liters per day. Today, this liquid is collected with a steel scoop, but in the past, an elongated gourd was used as a tube to suck the juice out. Between gatherings, the plant's leaves are bent over the center where the juice collects to keep out bugs and dirt. This center is regularly scraped out to keep the plant's production of sap active. Most maguey plants produce this aguamiel for about four to six months before they finally die. Some plants can yield up to 600 L of pulque. 

The collected juice is placed into 50-liter barrels and carried from the field to the fermentation vats. These vats, called tinas, are located in a special building called a tinacal. This word derives from Spanish tina and Nahuatl calli that means house of vats. When pulque haciendas reached their peak in the late 19th century, hacienda life revolved around these tinacals. It typically was a rectangular shed of stone with a wooden roof. The upper parts of the walls opened for air circulation and the façades were sometimes decorated with indigenous designs or other images associated with the making of pulque. One popular motif was the discovery of pulque by Xochitl. Other popular elements were the images of the hacienda's patron saint and the Virgin of Guadalupe. Inside were the vats, which were cowhide stretched over wooden frames lined up against the walls. In larger tinacals, there were three or four rows of vats. Today, the tinas are made of oak, plastic or fiberglass and hold about 1,000 liters each.

After placing the juice in the fermentation vats, mature seed pulque (semilla or xanaxtli) is added to "jump start" the process. Unlike beer, the fermenting agent present in pulque is a bacterium of the species Zymomonas mobilis (syn. Thermobacterium mobile ) rather than yeast. Those in charge of the fermentation process guard their trade secrets, passing them on from father to son. Fermentation takes from seven to 14 days, and the process seems to be more art than science. A number of factors can affect fermenting pulque, such as temperature, humidity and the quality of the aguamiel.

The process is complex and delicate, and can go sour at any point. For this reason, and perhaps due to its ancient "sacred" character, there are rituals and prohibitions. Religious songs and prayers may be offered, and women, children and strangers are not allowed inside the tinacal. Other superstitions include those against eating canned fish and wearing a hat inside the tinacal. The first is claimed to cause a bad taste in the pulque and the second is considered bad luck. To cleanse the bad luck, the offender must fill the hat with pulque and drink it down.

Just before the peak of fermentation, the pulque is quickly shipped to market in barrels. The fermentation process is continuous, so the pulque must be consumed within a certain time before it spoils.

Consumption

Most pulque is consumed in bars called pulquerías. At the beginning of the 20th century, more than 1,000 were located in Mexico City alone. By the early 20th century, pulquerías became socially accepted, and some were places of great elegance. But whether for rich or poor, two features stood out among these establishments: odd or catchy names, and murals decorating the walls. Names included (translated) "My Office", "Memories of the Future", "Drink and Go", "I'm Waiting for You Here at the Corner", and, across the street from the National Chamber of Deputies, "The Recreation Center of Those Across the Street". Diego Rivera once said one of the most important manifestations of Mexican painting was the murals that decorated the facades and interiors of pulquerías. One tradition maintained at all pulquerias at the beginning of the 20th century was to put sawdust on the floor. The tradition at that time was to begin a pulque-drinking session by spilling a little on the floor or ground as an offering to Mother Earth.  Traditional pulquerías tend to be like clubs with closed membership, with casual visitors ignored or sometimes stared at. Frequent visits and large consumption of the drink tends to win acceptance. While some establishments may forbid women, it is much more common for the establishment to provide a separate seating area for them. Intermingling of the sexes is not permitted. In the more rural areas of Hidalgo and Tlaxcala, where most pulque is made, the pulque is fresher and better. A vendor usually displays a white flag over the door when a fresh shipment has arrived.

Traditionally, pulque is served from large barrels on ice. and served into glasses, using a jicara, which is a half of a calabash tree gourd. The bartender is called a jicarero. In a pulquería, cruzado, meaning something like "bottoms up", is a frequent salute.

Drinking glasses have colorful names and can reflect a customer's ability to drink pulque. Large two-liter glasses are called macetas (flower pots), one-liter glasses are called cañones (cannons), half–liters are called  chivitos (little goats), quarter-liter glasses are catrinas (dandies), and eighth-liter glasses are tornillos (screws). Traditionally, these glasses are made from a greenish, hand blown glass. Pulque can be drunk straight from the barrel or can have a number of additives, such as fruit or nuts, added. Pulque prepared this way is called curado or cured.

One of the limitations to pulque's popularity has been the inability to store it for long periods or ship it far. Recently, pulque makers have found a way to preserve the beverage in cans. However, they admit this does change the flavor. The hope is that with this innovation, pulque can regain its lost market in Mexico and even achieve success as an export item, like tequila. It is already being offered in the United States by Boulder Imports, selling the brand "Nectar del Razo". The original market was Mexican-American men, but the company reports the product is having success as a health food, sought out by athletes and body builders.

Nutritional value
There is a saying that pulque "sólo le falta un grado para ser carne" – "it is only a bit shy of being meat",  referring to the purported nutritional value of the drink. Mesoamericans allowed pregnant women and the elderly to imbibe what was normally reserved only for priests and nobility. Modern analysis of the liquid has found that it contains carbohydrates; vitamins C, B-complex, D, and E; and amino acids and minerals such as iron and phosphorus.

Pulque tourism
From the glory days of pulque, the state of Hidalgo has about 250 pulque haciendas, many of which have been abandoned or converted to other uses, such as ranching. Their tinacals have either disappeared or been converted into storage or party rooms. A few remaining ones continue to make pulque, but use more modern and sanitary facilities. In Tlaxcala, the federal Secretariat of Tourism and the state government have organized a tour called the "Pulque Route", which includes the main haciendas that still make the beverage in this state. It is a two-day route which begins at the Church of La Barca de la Fe in Calpulalpan to the San Bartolo Hacienda, which is the principal exporter of canned pulque. This hacienda was the property of Ignacio Torres Adalid, who was called the "king of pulque". Today, it belongs to Ricardo del Razo. The tour also covers maguey fields like those around a town called Guillermo Ramirez.

These old haciendas varied widely. Some were ostentatious with great architectural harmony such as the Montecillos Hacienda, of Spanish colonial style and originally built in the 17th century by the Jesuits or San Antonio Ometusco Hacienda built by architect Antonio Rivas Mercado. However, most haciendas were the result of a constructive process that started in the 16th century, with mixed architectural styles and methods of both Mexico and Europe. One characteristic feature is Neo-Gothic towers. The Santiago Tetlapayac Hacienda has murals related to charreada and attributed to the painter Icaza.  The Zotoluca Hacienda has an octagonal floorplan in Neo-Moorish style and was restored in the 1950s. But the center of each of these pulque haciendas is the tinacal. They were planned and decorated befitting their importance. Almost all have interesting architectural details, such as a specially decorated main doorway, murals or sculpted windows. Some are considered works of art, such as the tinacal at the Montecillos Hacienda or the one at the San Antonio Ometusco Hacienda, which also has an elegant canopy covering the shipping dock with moulded iron columns and walls decorated with murals relating to the history of pulque.

Popular culture
Awareness of pulque received a boost in the 1960s after the release of the 1966 film, The Appaloosa. In the film, Matt Fletcher (Marlon Brando) is sitting in a cantina enjoying a pulque.

See also
 Agave nectar
 Cauim
 Chicha
 Mezcal
 Miske
 Palm toddy
 Tepoztecatl
 Tequila

Notes

References

Fermented drinks
Fermented foods
Agave
Mexican alcoholic drinks
Indigenous cuisine of the Americas
Aztec mythology and religion
Mesoamerican cuisine
Mexican art
Spanish colonization of the Americas
Race in Latin America
Historical drinks